The Maiden Lane Estate is a housing estate in Camden, located beside York Way and several railway lines.  It was designed by the architects George Benson and Alan Forsyth, and built between 1979 and 1982.

Notable residents
 Samuel Adewunmi, actor

References and sources
References

 Maiden Lane, Modern Architecture London
 'The Architecture of the Maiden Lane Estate: A second opinion', Bill Hillier et al. http://discovery.ucl.ac.uk/1751/

Housing estates in the London Borough of Camden